Aris Zustra Briggs (born November 9, 1996) is an American soccer player who plays as a forward.

Career

Youth
Briggs played with the Concorde Fire academy team, where he scored 5 goals in 35 appearances.

College and amateur 
In 2018, Briggs attended Georgia State University to play college soccer. Briggs spent three seasons with the Panthers, making 53 appearances and earning All-Sun Belt First Team honors in each season, including Sun Belt Offensive Player of the Year in 2019 and 2020. Briggs finished his college career as the 9th all-time scorer in Georgia State University history with 27 goals.

In 2019, Briggs also played in the NPSL with Greenville FC, scoring a single goal in 9 appearances over the regular season and playoffs.

Professional 
On January 21, 2021, Briggs was selected 61st overall in the 2021 MLS SuperDraft by Real Salt Lake. On April 9, 2021, Briggs signed with Salt Lake's USL Championship side Real Monarchs.

He made his professional debut on May 8, 2021, appearing as an 87th-minute substitute during a 2–2 draw with San Antonio FC. He scored his first professional goal on June 30, 2021, netting in a 3–2 win over New Mexico United.

On December 10, 2021, Indy Eleven announced Briggs would join them ahead of the 2022 USL Championship season. He left Indy Eleven following their 2022 season.

References

External links 
 Aris Briggs at Indy Eleven

1996 births
American soccer players
Association football forwards
Georgia State Panthers men's soccer players
Indy Eleven players
Living people
National Premier Soccer League players
Soccer players from Memphis, Tennessee
Real Monarchs players
Real Salt Lake draft picks
USL Championship players